Christopher Seamus Michael Conn (born 22 November 2001) is a Northern Irish professional footballer who plays as a midfielder for Altrincham on loan from  club Fleetwood Town.

Having started his senior career at Glentoran, Conn-Clarke joined Premier League club Burnley as a scholar in 2018. He had a spell on loan at Chorley in 2020 and signed for Fleetwood Town on EFL League One in February 2021, making his debut in September of that year.

Early life
Conn-Clarke is from Antrim.

Club career
Having previously played for Linfield's youth academy, he joined Glentoran aged 11. In summer 2017, he was offered a scholarship by English Premier League club Burnley, but remained at Glentoran for the 2017–18 season due to his age. He made his senior debut for Glentoran on 28 April 2018 as a substitute in a 3–1 defeat to Ballinamallard United. He joined English Premier League club Burnley on a two-year scholarship in summer 2018. In summer 2020, he was given a one-year extension to his scholarship. In October 2020, he joined National League North club Chorley on a work experience loan, where he made 2 appearances.

In February 2021, it was announced that Conn-Clarke had joined Fleetwood Town on an 18-month contract with an option to extend by a year. On 1 July 2021, Fleetwood Town announced that his contract had been extended until the end on the 2022–23 season, with the option of a further year. He made his debut for the club on 25 September 2021 as a substitute in a 2–2 draw away to Cambridge United. On 4 February 2022, he was sent out on loan to National League side Altrincham on an initial one-month loan. In July 2022, Conn-Clarke returned to Altrincham until January 2023.

On 31 January 2023, Conn-Clarke signed for League of Ireland First Division club Waterford on a season long loan.

International career
Conn-Clarke has represented Northern Ireland at under-17, under-19 and under-21 levels.

Career statistics

References

External links

2001 births
Living people
Association footballers from Northern Ireland
Northern Ireland youth international footballers
Northern Ireland under-21 international footballers
Association football midfielders
Linfield F.C. players
Glentoran F.C. players
Burnley F.C. players
Chorley F.C. players
Fleetwood Town F.C. players
Altrincham F.C. players
Waterford F.C. players
NIFL Premiership players
English Football League players
National League (English football) players
League of Ireland players